List of banks registered in the British offshore financial centre of Jersey:

Barclays Bank plc, Jersey Branch                       
BNP Paribas S.A. Jersey Branch           
BNP Paribas Securities Services Custody Bank 
Butterfield Bank (Jersey) Limited                    
Citibank N.A., Jersey Branch                 
Citicorp Banking Corporation                   
The Co-operative Bank                 
Deutsche Bank International                                
EFG Private Bank (Channel Islands) Limited, Jersey Branch                                   
HSBC Bank Plc, Jersey Branch                                                
Investec Bank (Channel Islands) Limited, Jersey Branch                 
JPMorgan Chase Bank N.A., Jersey Branch         
Kleinwort Benson (Channel Islands)             
Lloyds Bank Jersey Branch                
Lloyds Bank International
Royal Bank of Canada (Channel Islands) Limited, Jersey Branch          
The Royal Bank of Scotland International Limited (includes Natwest)   
Nedbank Private Wealth Limited, Jersey Branch
Standard Bank Jersey                             
Standard Chartered Bank, Jersey Branch  
Santander           
UBS AG, Jersey Branch                              
Union Bancaire Privée, Jersey Branch

References

List of regulated entities from the Jersey Financial Services Commission 

 
Jersey
Banks
Banks in Jersey
Banks of the United Kingdom
Banks
Jersey